CFR Title 32 – National Defense is one of 50 titles composing the United States Code of Federal Regulations (CFR). Title 32 is the principal set of rules and regulations  issued by federal agencies of the United States regarding national defense. It is available in digital and printed form and can be referenced online using the Electronic Code of Federal Regulations (e-CFR).

Structure 
The table of contents, as reflected in the e-CFR updated February 28, 2014, is as follows:

References 

 32